Seaman  Philip Bazaar, born in Chile, South America, was a United States Navy seaman who was awarded the Medal of Honor, the highest military decoration of the United States for valor in combat. According to the citation he distinguished himself during the battle for Fort Fisher of the American Civil War.

Biography

Bazaar, a resident of Massachusetts, was an immigrant from Chile who joined the Union Navy at New Bedford, Massachusetts. Bazaar was assigned to the  during the American Civil War. Santiago de Cuba was a wooden, brigantine-rigged, side-wheel steamship under the command of Rear Admiral David D. Porter.

In the later part of 1864, Union General Ulysses S. Grant ordered an assault on Fort Fisher, a stronghold of the Confederate States of America. It protected the vital trading routes of Wilmington's port, at North Carolina. Rear Admiral Porter was in charge of the naval assault and General Benjamin F. Butler was in charge of the land assault. After the failure of the first assault, Butler was replaced by Major General Alfred Terry. A second assault was ordered for January 1865. Bazaar was aboard the USS Santiago de Cuba and served in both assaults on the fort. On January 12, 1865, both ground and naval Union forces attempted the second assault. Bazaar and 5 other crew members, under the direct orders from Rear Admiral Porter, carried dispatches during the battle while under heavy fire from the Confederates to Major General Alfred Terry. Bazaar and his comrades were awarded the Medal of Honor for their actions.

Medal of Honor citation

Awards and decorations
Bazaar's awards and decorations include the following:

See also

 List of Hispanic Medal of Honor recipients
 List of American Civil War Medal of Honor recipients: A–F
 Hispanics in the American Civil War
 List of Medal of Honor recipients for the Second Battle of Fort Fisher
 Hispanics in the United States Navy

References

External links
 
 

Year of birth missing
Year of death missing
Chilean emigrants to the United States
United States Navy Medal of Honor recipients
Union Navy sailors
Foreign-born Medal of Honor recipients
American Civil War recipients of the Medal of Honor